Martin Hancock is an English actor best known for his roles as Geoffrey "Spider" Nugent in the English soap Coronation Street (between 1997 and 2003 and again from 2022 onwards) and as Reg Lund in Holby City.

Early life
Hancock was born in Fulham to an English father and a New Zealander mother. He attended Drayton Manor High School in West London and trained at the Drama Centre London.

Career
Hancock has had roles in a number of English television series, including BBC's This Life and the ITV1 cult drama Demons. He has also had film roles in 24 Hour Party People, Chasing Liberty (2004), Kingdom of Heaven (2005) and Defiance (2008), as well as in a number of theatre productions.

However, his most famous role remains that of Emily Bishop's eco-warrior nephew, Geoffrey "Spider" Nugent, in the long-running English soap Coronation Street. Hancock left the show as a regular in 2000, feeling that his character of Spider had run its course.

It was announced in May 2022, that Hancock is to return to the programme and reprise the role of Spider in July 2022.

In 2007, he appeared as himself on an episode of Celebrity MasterChef.

Personal life 
He lives in London with his wife, and is a supporter of West Ham United F.C.

Filmography

Film

Television

References

External links 
 
 

Living people
Male actors from London
People educated at Drayton Manor High School
Alumni of the Drama Centre London
English male soap opera actors
1969 births